Sandro Petraglia (born 19 April 1947) is an Italian screenwriter. He began his career in the early 1970s as a film critic, writing for the May 68–inspired film magazine Ombre rosse. During this time, Petraglia first met with his future screenwriting collaborator Stefano Rulli.

Filmography

Film

Television

Awards and nominations

References

External links

1947 births
Living people
Writers from Rome
Italian male screenwriters
David di Donatello winners
Nastro d'Argento winners
Ciak d'oro winners